Mount Blanco is a small white hill — an erosional remnant — located on the eastern border of the Llano Estacado within Blanco Canyon in Crosby County, Texas.  With Blanco Canyon, it is the type locality of the Blanco Formation of Texas and Kansas, as well as the Blancan fauna, which occurs throughout North America.

Geology
The term "Blanco Canyon beds", later shortened to "Blanco beds", was first applied to this formation in 1890 by William F. Cummins of the Geological Survey of Texas. The Blanco beds are considered to be of lacustrine origin – deposited in a Pleistocene lake basin set upon the Ogallala Formation of Pliocene age, which underlies the upper surface sediments of the Llano Estacado. The formation mainly consists of light-gray, fine-grained mudstone, sandstone, and some conglomerate. These light-colored sediments contrast sharply with the locally rust-colored sediments of the Ogallala Formation.

Fossil fauna
All fossil fauna are from Mount Blanco modified from Dalquest (1975) unless otherwise noted.

 Class Mammalia
 Order Perissodactyla
 Family Equidae
 †Equus cumminsi
 †Equus simplicidens
 †Nannippus peninsulatus
 Order Artiodactyla
 Family Antilocapridae
 Family Camelidae
 †Blancocamelus meadei
 †Camelops traviswhitei
 †Canimartes cumminsi
 †Titanotylopus spatulus
 Family Cervidae
 †Odocoileus brachyodontus
 Family Tayassuidae
 †Platygonus biccalcaratus
 †Tanupolama blancoensis
 Superorder Edentata
 Family †Glyptodontidae
 †Glyptotherium texanum
 Family Megalonychidae
 †Megalonyx leptostomus
 Family †Mylodontidae
 †Glossotherium chapadmalens
 Order Lagomorpha
 Family Leporidae
 †Hypolagus sp.
 †Nekrolagus progressus
 Order Proboscidea
 Family †Gomphotheriidae
 †Stegomastodon mirificus
 Order Carnivora
 Family Canidae
 †Borophagus diversidens
 †Canis lepophagus
 Family Felidae
 †Felis cf. lacustris
 †Dinofelis palaeoonca
 †Homotherium
 Family Ursidae
 †Arctotherium?
 Family Hyaenidae
 †Chasmaporthetes ossifragus
 Family Mustelidae
 †Canimartes cummins
 †Spilogale rexroadi
 Order Rodentia
 Family Sciuridae
 †Paenemarmota barbouri
 Spermophilus sp.
 †Spermophilius howelli
 Family Geomyidae
 Geomys sp.
 Family Heteromyidae
 †Perognathus parlettensis
 †Perognathus rexroadensis
 †Prodipomys centralis
 Family Cricetidae
 Baiomys sp.
 †Bensonomys sp.
 †Neotoma quadriplicatus
 Onychomys sp.
 † Peromyscus kansasensis
 Reithrodontomys sp.
 †Sigmodon medius
 Class Reptilia
 Order Testudinata
 Family Testudinidae
 Geochelone sp.

Images

See also

Blancan
Blanco Canyon
Caprock Escarpment
Double Mountain Fork Brazos River
Duffy's Peak
Mushaway Peak
White River (Texas)
Yellow House Canyon

References

External links
Mt. Blanco Fossil Museum

Geology of Texas
Landforms of Crosby County, Texas
Rock formations of Texas
Cenozoic paleontological sites of North America
Paleontology in Texas